Georgi Petrov Mihalev (born July 16, 1968 in Burgas) is a retired backstroke swimmer from Bulgaria. He was a member of the Bulgarian National Swimming Team for the period of 1981 to 1994.

Major Achievements
Two time European vicechampion for cadets in 100-meter and 200-meter backstroke, Mulhouse - 1983
Two time European Champion for cadets in 100-meter and 200-meter backstroke, Luxembourg - 1984
Champion of Bulgaria between 1982 - 1993
Bulgarian national record holder in men's 50-meter, 100-meter and 200-meter backstroke
Many times champion of Balkan games

Event participation 
 Friendship Games (1984) in Moscow
 1988 Summer Olympics in Seoul, South Korea and 1992 Summer Olympics in Barcelona, Spain
 World Swimming Championships - 1986 Madrid, Spain; 1991 Perth, Australia
 European Championships for cadets and later for men - between 1982 and 1993
 Balkan Championship Games

References
 First Bulgarian Swimming Site
 Bulgarian Swimming Sports Federation
 

1968 births
Living people
Male backstroke swimmers
Bulgarian male swimmers
Olympic swimmers of Bulgaria
Swimmers at the 1988 Summer Olympics
Swimmers at the 1992 Summer Olympics
Sportspeople from Burgas